Garr-e Kalagh Neshin-e Amirabad (also Romanized as Garr-e Kalāgh Neshīn-e Amīrābād; also known as Garr-e Kalāgh Neshīn) is a village in Dasht-e Rum Rural District, in the Central District of Boyer-Ahmad County, Kohgiluyeh and Boyer-Ahmad Province, Iran. At the 2006 census, its population was 199, in 35 families.

References 

Populated places in Boyer-Ahmad County